Vodnik may refer to:
Vodnik (sports society), a Soviet Voluntary Sports Society
Vodnik (mythology), a male water spirit in Slavic mythology
 Vodník (poem), written by Antonín Dvořák in 1896
Vodnik Arkhangelsk, a bandy club from Arkhangelsk in Russia.
Vodyanoy or Vodnik, a male water spirit
GAZ-3937 "Vodnik", a Russian high-mobility multipurpose military vehicle manufactured by GAZ
Vodnik, the Croatian name for Vodnic village, Lupac Commune, Caraş-Severin County, Romania
 The rank denoting a current-day Sergeant in the Militia of the SFR Yugoslavia

People with the surname
Anton Vodnik (1901-1965), Slovene art historian, and critic
Valentin Vodnik (1758-1819), Slovene priest, journalist and poet